Ka Wah Bank Limited (Traditional Chinese: 嘉華銀行有限公司) was a bank in Hong Kong. It was acquired by CITIC International Financial Holdings and renamed as CITIC Ka Wah Bank Limited (Traditional Chinese: 中信嘉華銀行有限公司)(In May 2010, CITIC Ka Wah Bank Limited was renamed as CITIC Bank International Limited(Traditional Chinese: 中信銀行國際有限公司)).

History 
1922: Ka Wah Ngan Ho (Traditional Chinese: 嘉華銀號) was founded in Guangzhou by Dr. Lam Chi Fung, the founding president of Hong Kong Baptist College. Its name, Ka Wah, was derived from the names of Ka Nam Tong and Nam Wah Company.
1924: Ka Wah Savings Bank Limited (Traditional Chinese: 嘉華儲蓄銀行有限公司) was founded in Hong Kong. Ka Wah Ngan Ho in Guangzhou then became Ka Wah Savings Bank Limited, Guangzhou Branch.
1926: Ka Wah Savings Bank Limited was renamed as Ka Wah Bank Public Limited Company (Traditional Chinese: 嘉華銀行公眾有限公司).
1931: Shanghai branch was established.
1935: Branches in Shanghai and Guangzhou were closed down.
1945: It reopened in Hong Kong.
1949: It was renamed as Ka Wah Bank Limited.
1974: C.S. Low (Low Chung Song 刘灿松), a Singapore businessman and banker, led takeover of Ka Wah Bank in December 1974 from a group of U.S. investors. He became the bank's largest shareholder.
1975: After C.S. Low assumed management of the bank, business expanded rapidly.
1980: It was listed on the Hong Kong Stock Exchange. Underwritten by Chase Manhattan Asia.
1983: Between 1975 and 1983, the bank's net earnings rose by about 2,200%.
1986: Ka Wah Bank suffered from financial difficulties, and CITIC Group injected HK$350 million capital into the bank.
1998: Ka Wah Bank was renamed as CITIC Ka Wah Bank Limited.
2002: CITIC Ka Wah Bank was privatized by CITIC International Financial Holdings and it became a whole-owned subsidiary of CITIC International Financial Holdings.

See others 
CITIC Ka Wah Bank
David Lam See-chai, one of nine children of Lam Chi Fung who later moved to Canada and became the Lieutenant Governor of British Columbia

References

Banks established in 1922
Companies based in Guangzhou
Defunct banks of Hong Kong
Companies formerly listed on the Hong Kong Stock Exchange
Banks disestablished in 1998